Robert George Kline [Junior] (December 9, 1909 – March 16, 1987) was a pitcher in Major League Baseball who played for three teams between the 1930 and 1934 seasons. Listed at 6' 3", 200 lb., Kline batted and threw right-handed. He was born in Enterprise, Ohio.

Career

A fastball thrower, Kline started and filled various relief roles coming out from the bullpen as a closer, middle reliever, and set-up man. He entered the majors in 1930 with the Boston Red Sox, playing for them four years before joining the Philadelphia Athletics (1934) and Washington Senators (1934). While in Boston, he learned to pitch a sinker from roommate Wilcy Moore which helped him to win 11 games in 1932.

On October 1, 1933, Kline was the opposing pitcher at Yankee Stadium during the last pitching appearance for Babe Ruth. At the end of the season, he was sent by Boston along Rabbit Warstler and cash to the Athletics in the same transaction that brought Lefty Grove, Rube Walberg and Max Bishop to the Red Sox. He split the season with Philadelphia and Washington, collecting seven relief wins to lead the American League pitchers.

In a five-season career, Kline posted a 30-28 record with 87 strikeouts and a 5.05 earned run average in 148 appearances, including 37 starts, eight complete games, one shutout, seven saves, and 441⅔ innings of work.

Following his playing career, Kline managed the 1946 Marion Cardinals and 1947 Johnson City Cardinals. He died in Westerville, Ohio, at age 77.

External links

Baseball Library
Retrosheet

1909 births
1987 deaths
Baseball players from Ohio
Boston Red Sox players
Buffalo Bisons (minor league) players
Erie Sailors players
Major League Baseball pitchers
Marion Cardinals players
Milwaukee Brewers (minor league) players
Minneapolis Millers (baseball) players
Minor league baseball managers
People from Van Wert County, Ohio
Philadelphia Athletics players
Washington Senators (1901–1960) players